ZIP FM is a commercial radio station in Lithuania, broadcasting from capital city of Vilnius. Started on 1 July 2005.

External links

Facebook page

2005 establishments in Lithuania
Radio stations in Lithuania
Mass media in Vilnius